Dos Mundos: Evolución + Tradición is the 13th studio album recorded by Mexican performer Alejandro Fernández, It was released by Fonovisa on December 8, 2009 (see 2009 in music).

Album information
Dos Mundos is a double album by Alejandro Fernández featuring two different genres on each album. Dos Mundos: Evolución features songs recorded in Latin Pop, while Dos Mundos: Tradición features songs recorded in Regional Mexican. The two albums were sold both separately and bundled together under the title, Dos Mundos: Evolución + Tradición, making Fernández in one of few Latin artist to do something similar.

Track listing

Reception

Regarding Dos Mundos: Evolución, James Monger of Allmusic gave the album a four-star rating  and noted the album "relies on the glossy, straight-up Latin pop with elements of ballad, bolero, and mariachi that became his forte in the early 20th century". For Dos Mundos: Tradición, Alex Henderson gave the 3.5 out of 5 and compared the decision of Fernandez's to produce two albums by the same manner of Rocío Banquells. For the latter album, he called a "likable effort whether one is enjoying it as a stand-alone CD or as half of the double-disc Dos Mundos: Evolución y Tradición". Tijana Ilich of About.com gave both albums a five-star rating a called Evolución "Smooth, heartfelt, lyrically interesting pop" and "a good mix, expertly executed" for the musical genres of Tradición.

Sales and certifications

See also
 List of number-one albums of 2010 (Mexico)
 List of number-one Billboard Latin Albums from the 2010s

References

2009 albums
Alejandro Fernández albums
Spanish-language albums
Fonovisa Records albums
Albums produced by Kike Santander
Albums produced by Julio Reyes Copello
Albums produced by Joan Sebastian